Kfar Haroeh (lit. Haroeh Village) is a religious moshav in central Israel. Located in the coastal plain between Hadera and Netanya, it falls under the jurisdiction of Hefer Valley Regional Council.

History
Kfar HaRoeh was established on 23 November 1933 and named for Abraham Isaac Kook, the first Ashkenazi chief rabbi of Mandate Palestine. "Haroeh" is an acronym for HaRav Avraham HaCohen Kook. The founders were religious Jews who immigrated from Europe. The land which the village was built on had been bought by the Jewish National Fund.

The yeshiva on the moshav was founded by Rabbi Moshe-Zvi Neria.
This was the forerunner of the numerous Mamlachti Dati Torah high schools associated with Bnei Akiva.

In 2009, the yeshiva celebrated its 70th birthday in the presence of many distinguished alumni.

Beit Hazon, initially a neighborhood of Kfar HaRoah, is now regarded as  a separate community settlement.

References

External links
Official website 

Abraham Isaac Kook
Moshavim
Religious Israeli communities
Populated places established in 1933
1933 establishments in Mandatory Palestine
Populated places in Central District (Israel)